Joanne Sarah "Jo" Thompson (born 13 May 1965 in Dartford, Kent, England) is a former field hockey goalkeeper, who was a member of the British squad that won the bronze medal at the 1992 Summer Olympics in Barcelona. She also participated in the 1996 Summer Olympics in Atlanta, Georgia, where Team GB finished fourth. She is a former pupil of Langley Grammar School. She now works for PPG  in Stowmarket UK

References

External links
 
 
 

British female field hockey players
Female field hockey goalkeepers
Olympic field hockey players of Great Britain
Olympic bronze medallists for Great Britain
Field hockey players at the 1992 Summer Olympics
Field hockey players at the 1996 Summer Olympics
1965 births
Living people
Olympic medalists in field hockey
Medalists at the 1992 Summer Olympics